Morningside Heights is a residential neighbourhood  in Toronto, Ontario, Canada. It is located in the northeast corner of the city,  in the district of Scarborough, just north of the neighbourhood of Malvern and west of Rouge Park and the Rouge.

The area is named after Morningside Avenue, which was extended north into the neighbourhood. The northern section of Morningside Heights is also known as Brookside. The community is divided, north and south, by hydro lines that cut across the development. The name Brookside originates from a golf course that was once on the site, northeast of the intersection of Oasis Boulevard and Seasons Drive.

Local residents formed the Morningside Heights Neighbourhood Association in 2015. In 2018, it was registered with the Ontario Ministry of Government and Consumer Services as a not-for-profit group.

History

The first phase of Morningside Heights development took place in 2002. The last houses to be constructed were completed in 2015. The area has proved to be very diverse, with a large number of South Asian (predominantly Sri Lankan Tamils, Pakistanis, and Indians), Caribbean and Filipino residents among others.

The neighbourhood is entirely residential with no commercial developments, although it contains unused land intended for future developments. The local homeowners association was successful in stopping the planned proposal for a gas station to be built at the southwest corner of Neilson Road and Morningside Avenue, citing potential health risks.

Education
Two public school boards operate schools in Morningside Heights, the separate Toronto Catholic District School Board (TCDSB), and the secular Toronto District School Board (TDSB).

TDSB operates two public elementary schools (JK-Grade 8) in the neighbourhood, Brookside Public School, and Thomas Wells Public School. Brookside sits on much of the former golf course and is surrounded by single-detached housing. Designed by Teeple Architects, this school was opened in September 2007. Also this school has achieved the LEED Gold" certification. Students attending Brookside requires school uniform. Thomas Wells Public School, named after Thomas Leonard Wells, was opened in September 2005. This school was the first LEED Silver certified elementary school in Canada. Currently the school has over 700 students.  this was derived from the street that The school is located on Nightstar Road.

TCDSB operates one public elementary school in the neighbourhood, Blessed Pier Giorgio Frassati Catholic School, located adjacent to Brookside Public School. The school opened in September 2013. The building itself is divided into public and school use areas, and includes a multi-purpose room available for specialty programs and after hours use. The building is barrier free and include an elevator and barrier free washrooms. The school includes purpose built classrooms for Junior and Senior Kindergarten, and features a well-defined, student-friendly playground areas that combine hard and soft landscaping. Environmentally friendly by design, the building incorporates enhanced access to natural light, particularly in classrooms, water efficient landscaping, enhanced site storm water management, an energy efficient building envelope which includes high performance windows and a cool white roof to reduce heat gain through the roof. The school also requires students to wear uniforms. The school is named after Pier Giorgio Frassati.

Neither school board operates a secondary school in the neighbourhood, with TCDSB/TDSB secondary school students residing in Morningside Heights attending institutions in other neighbourhoods. The French-based public secular school board, Conseil scolaire Viamonde, and it separate counterpart, Conseil scolaire catholique MonAvenir also offer schooling to applicable residents of Morningside, although they do not operate a school in the neighbourhood, with CSCM/CSV students attending schools situated in other neighbourhoods in Toronto.

Transportation 

Major east-west roadways located in Morningside Heights includes Finch Avenue, and Steeles Avenue, with the latter road acting as the boundary for the neighbourhood. The northern end of Morningside Avenue is also located at Morningside Heights

Public transportation
Public transportation is provided by the Toronto Transportation Commission's (TTC) bus system. TTC bus services include Route 133 Neilson, linking the neighbourhood to Scarborough Centre station of the Toronto subway. Route 53A Steeles East also serves the northeast section of the area, which travels as far as Finch station in North York. Furthermore, Route 939C Finch Express provides express bus service to Finch station during weekday rush hours.

References 

Neighbourhoods in Toronto
Scarborough, Toronto